John Haymaker was an early settler of Ohio and the founder of Franklin Township and what would become the city of Kent, Ohio.  Haymaker and his family, who were of German descent, moved west from Pittsburgh to Franklin Township in the Connecticut Western Reserve on the banks of the Cuyahoga River in early November 1805, shortly after Ohio had become a state. Haymaker built a gristmill in 1807 to take advantage of a nearby waterfall. He sold the mill and some of the surrounding land to Jacob Reed in 1811. In 1817 Reed would sell the property to George B. Depeyster and William H. Price, who helped develop the villages of Carthage in the north and Franklin Mills in the south.  These two villages would eventually grow to become today's Kent, Ohio.

See also
History of Kent, Ohio
Haymaker Parkway

External links
Kent Historical Society

References

People from Kent, Ohio
History of Kent, Ohio
18th-century births
19th-century deaths